Billbergia iridifolia is a plant species in the genus Billbergia. This species is native to Brazil.

Cultivars
 Billbergia 'Blireiana'

References

BSI Cultivar Registry Retrieved 11 October 2009

iridifolia
Endemic flora of Brazil
Flora of the Atlantic Forest